Saliba (also transliterated "Saleeba") or Salibi (also transliterated "Saleebey" or "Saleeby") is a Christian family name of Syriac-Aramaic origin used in the Levant and Malta. The family name comes from the Syriac  , meaning "the cross", a reference to the crucifixion of Jesus Christ.

Overview 

Historically, the Saliba family has been Antiochian Orthodox and of upper-middle and upper classes in their respective countries. Since Ottoman times, the majority of Salibas involved themselves in professional, political and cultural professions serving as mediators between their local communities and Muslim overlords. Today, many Salibas are prominent doctors, lawyers, bishops, media personalities, business owners, professors, writers and political activists. Based primarily in smaller towns such as Nazareth, Mandate Palestine and Bteghrine in Mount Lebanon, by the 1930s and 1940s, most families established themselves in cities in what's today Shefa-'Amr, Israel and Achrafieh, a neighborhood of Beirut. Since the Ottoman persecutions during the 1860 Mount Lebanon civil war, to the 1948 Palestinian exodus and Lebanese Civil War, various branches of the Saliba family have made their way abroad. Today, just as many Salibas live in the Middle East as those in the United States, Canada, Germany, France, Denmark, Australia and various countries in North Africa.

Religion 

Overwhelmingly Antiochian Orthodox, the family has significant numbers of other Christians including those from the Melkite Greek Catholic Church and Syriac Orthodox, Maronite Catholic, Roman Catholic and smaller amounts of Protestant converts. Throughout various Arabic-speaking Christian communities, the surname and members of the family are widely known. The family names Saleeby and Saliba have been in use in Lebanon, Palestine and Syria since at least the 2nd century AD and are speculated by many to be one of the first Christian family names.

Today, several key archbishops both in the Middle East and in the diaspora have attained significant honors. To varying degrees and through multiple mediums, clergy members of the Saliba family have spoken out against the genocide of Christians by ISIL and other groups such as the Yazidis. Further back in time, the Saliba name and its root "salib" grew in prominence and became a term to identify geographically Christian areas. In Aleppo, the Christian neighborhood of Saliba became famous in the tragic Massacre of Aleppo (1850). In Cairo, Saliba Street (شارع صليبة), a formerly Christian road, is now home to some of the greatest sites in Cairo. In the strategic Syrian city of Latakia, the Saliba neighborhood and square have become important demonstration sites in the Syrian Civil War. In Haifa, Wadi Salib (وادي صليب), or Valley of the Cross, was the site of much controversy, displacement and riot in the early half of the 20th century as Muslim and Christian residents were forcibly removed before and after the establishment of the state of Israel.

Varying historical narratives 
While there are many overlapping elements in each historical narrative, all three stories of the Saliba clan's settlement in Lebanon, Palestine and Syria embody key differences:

Sparta narrative 
The Sparta narrative is by far the most rich and complex tale of Saliba origin. In their family lands above the modern town of Bteghrine, Lebanon, there is an area known as "Sparta", many centuries earlier, the Saliba family named the area as such. The rich folklore that surrounds the area has been traced back thousands of years to before the birth of Jesus Christ to ancient Greece. The folklore composed by N.D. Saleeby, Souk-El-Gharb, Lebanon, 1947 A.D. is as follows:
	
This is a brevity of the Saleeby-Saliba history which goes back to the centuries before Christ up to the second century A.D. Beginning from Prince Petronious Amiries son of Polithictos, son of Epocratos, the Hellinc of Tibbanous family which ruled in Sparta during that time. This Amiries was born in a ship while his mother Aghrist with his uncle Emofaratis fled from Sparta after his father's death; this was near the shores of Byblos, the city of the Phoenician Gods.
This Amiries grew to be commander over Caesar's army. As an idolater although his mother, a Christian tried to convert him to her faith, but in vain. She prayed that her desire may be fulfilled. By a miracle he was converted by John, an apostle of Saint Paul, who converted and baptized him during the year 67 A.D. This was the same year when the apostles assembled in Antioch and were called Christians.
Thinking it unwise to return to Rome, he went to Huran in Syria where his friends and relatives lived in (El-Basseer). There, he built a home and moved his family and lived to be 101 years of age. He died and his body was carried back to Sparta and buried.
Amiries' son, Nocalaous, married and begat El-Gouth, a great hero who was called "El-Saleeby" by an Arabian prince for his wars against Jews and idolaters in defense of the Christian faith. He was born the year of 89 A.D. and died 197 A.D. in Azrah of Huran.
When the Christians lost power and wealth, they began to migrate - leaving their homes. John Ben Bilsarous El-Saleeby gave up Saint Jacob's Monastery to the Muslims. The place of worship was built by El-Gouth El-Saleeby during the second century. Following the events Jacob Demitry Saleeby migrated from Huran to El-Kourah in Lebanon. Where after Farris El-Saleeby, son of Acklidis - followed.
Al-Abry Farris' son left to Antioch and from him all the Saleeby's and Saliba's in that section descended. After Farris's death, Tamir, Jacob's son, became the leader, who, during his days, things developed until the 12th century when the Crusaders came from Europe to "rescue Jerusalem from the Muslims. But for the Crusade's bad conduct and mistreatment to the inhabitants of Lebanon, the Saleebys were forced to form an alliance with the Arabs to fight for their safety until 1380 when things were settled. When El-Wardy Ben-Mansour El-Saleeby died, the family began to scatter in all directions of the country where many were given sub-clan names other than Saleeby. About 30 branches were given various names. 
The Saleeby's who came from El-Koura to Bteghrine during 1625 A.D. were Jacob and his cousins Assad, Joseph and Harun, who came to Btalloon, built a home and lived. Thereafter, Joseph returned to Bteghrine and Harun went to Nabatieh. Assad and his family stayed at Btalloon. After, some of his children moved to Souk-El-Gharb and other towns nearby.
In 1886 migration to the western world began where we find thousands of Saleeby and Saliba families in North and South America, England, Africa, Australia, and all parts of the world.

While the tale is of great richness, the story is often disputed, especially among family members outside Bteghrine who contest its validity.

Western neo-Aramaic roots
Another theory, much more simplistic and without detail is the one of Western neo-Aramaic roots versus Spartan lineage. The general story goes as such:

Before the coming of Christ, the Saliba family were an inland Syriac-speaking Semitic people. Found in the Galilee and what is today eastern Lebanon and Western Syria, many Syriac-speaking local became enticed by the Christian message and converted. After the influence of Greek Byzantine traditions in coastal cities, the majority of Christians in these areas joined the Greek Orthodox Patriarch of Antioch. From these times on, families like the Saliba's became administrative and educated under the Greek system. After the coming of Islam, these Greek Orthodox families were easily adaptive and continued their tradition of education and administration under the many Islamic empires.

This theory offers many explanations to the Saliba story. With the Saliba name being of Aramaic/Syriac origin, it would make sense that their roots would be of non-Greek origin. Secondly, the prominence of using variants of Saliba as neighborhood and street names in Islamic cities such as Aleppo, Latakia and Cairo would attest to the great amount of travels prominent Arabic speaking Christians made in the various Islamic eras.

Melkite lineage
The last theory is that the Saliba family has their origins in a mix of many groups. The tale goes as this:

Before the times of Jesus, the Saliba family and people like them were Aramaic/Syriac and Greek-speaking Jews. The term Hellenistic Judaism describes those at the time who claimed Jewish ancestry, but followed Greek customs and culture. After encountering the Christian faith, many of these people converted. Until the Council of Chalcedon in 451 CE, all Christians of the Levant were united. After, however, more provincial populations and their traditions broke from the patriarchates of Rome and Constantinople. This split resulted in the Syriac Orthodox, Assyrian, Maronite and Armenian Apostolic traditions. For the more urbanized Greek-speaking Christians of the coast, their allegiances remained firmly with Constantinople and more specifically the Greek Orthodox Patriarch of Antioch. As time went on, their religious traditions evolved and resembled more Byzantine practices than those non-Chalcedonian Christians.

As time passed and Islam became dominant, Salibas continued to live in urban areas and maintain a close familial network from Antakya to Nazareth and Damascus to Latakia. During persecutions in the 17th and 18th centuries, many Salibas moved to more mountainous communities such as Bteghrine in Mount Lebanon. As the centuries continued, many moved for economic and political benefit to southern Lebanon, the Galilee and surrounding towns around Bteghrine. As modern urbanization grew in the 20th century, Salibas of Mount Lebanon and Galilee emigrated to cities like Beirut and Haifa for prosperity while maintaining their political and economic ties to cities like Bteghrine and Nazareth. After numerous wars and economic instability, members of the family moved to cities across the world.

Maltese usage 
The Saliba/Salibi Maltese familial connection is still disputed. While many contest them being of the same lineage, others believe that the two clans are connected. For those that argue against the notion, several factors are considered. Firstly, the Maltese language was originally a variant of Arabic and the surname could easily be a surname derived from the Arabic word for cross, salib. Another possibility is that the Maltese use the name in memory of the crusaders, in Arabic Salabayeen. For those that argue in favor of a common connection, a line would be drawn between the family's proposed relationship with Roman and Greek empires and maritime travel. Another possibility could be members of the Saliba family traveling as merchants to Malta in the early 800s along with other Muslim and Arab traders.

Notable people

Saliba
Adam Saliba - former Australian rules footballer 
Antoine Saliba - Founder and CEO of Antoine Saliba World of Jewelry one of the largest sellers of gold, silver and diamond jewelry in Lebanon and the Levant
:it:Antonio di Saliba - Italian painter of the 15th and 16th centuries
Antonious Saliba - Orthodox Priest in the 19th century who has had miracles attributed to them. Currently in process for sainthood.
Anthony Saliba - Prominent American businessman, philanthropist and co-founder of SpaceBound Inc. headquartered in the Greater Cleveland 
Anthony Saliba, prominent U.S. physician, surgeon, and fisherman.
Azar Saliba - General Manager- Hospitality Business and a great inspirational leader for millennials
Foad Saliba - Swedish-Persian robotics/implant engineer.
Gaby Saliba - Internationally recognized fashion designer based out of El Koura in the North of Lebanon 
George A. Saliba - CTO of multi-billion dollar Quantum Corp.  Currently has over 100 patents (published or in process) and is internationally recognized as an industry pioneer and inventor in data storage.
George Saliba – professor of Arabic and Islamic science of the Department of Middle East and Asian Languages and Cultures at Columbia University
George Saliba - Syriac Orthodox Archbishop of Mount Lebanon famous for his commentary and work with the Lebanese president in regards to the Syrian Civil War and the persecution of Christians in Iraq and Syria
Georgio Saliba - Greek Orthodox no notable accomplishments,  The American-Arab high school boy's passion for aviation led him to win a science fair competition by building a remote-controlled airplane. He also enjoys volunteering at the local animal shelter and has trained his own dog to be a therapy dog for elderly patients.
:fr: Ghassan Saliba - Famous Lebanese singer and actor who has released several well known albums in the region. Ghassan has collaborated on numerous occasions with Mansour Rahbani, one of the Rahbani Brothers and brother-in-law to Fairuz. Additionally, he has performed numerous times for UNESCO.
Greg Simon (Saliba) – current President of the Washington, D.C. based think tank FasterCures, Chief Domestic Policy Advisor to former Vice President Al Gore from 1993 to 1997 
Issa Saliba – CEO of Flavia Neapolis café branches in Nazareth and Nablus in Palestine
Issam Saliba - Lebanese-Canadian surgeon based in Montreal, Canada, is an otolaryngologist who developed a faster and less expensive technique for treating ruptured eardrums.
Issam Michael Saliba - Recognized expert on Islamic law and the laws of Middle Eastern and North African countries at the Law Library of Congress.  He provides legal advice in these areas to the U.S. Congress, executive branch, and judiciary. Additionally, Issam is a member of the International Council on Middle East Studies and provides legal opinions in regards to Lebanese domestic politics and Iraqi international policy.
Jacob Saliba - Former CEO and chairman of Katy Industries. Along with Edward Said, Jacob was an outspoken fan of prominent Palestinian businessman, philanthropist and leader Hasib Sabbagh. 
Jamel Saliba - New York City based artist and designer. Jamel is the founder of Melsy's Illustrations which are sold in stores such as Macy's and Bloomingdale's
Jamil bin Habib Al-Khoury Saliba - Syrian philosopher, author, teacher, lawyer, linguist, journalist, and translator. Former president of the Lebanese University, Syrian Secretary of Education, UNESCO Representative and board member at the Arabic Encyclopedia. 
Jean Jamil Saliba - Mayor of Bteghrine, Lebanon
Jean Mansour Saliba - Mayor of Bteghrine, Lebanon
Joe Saliba – general secretary of the Nationalist Party in Malta
John A. Saliba - Jesuit priest and professor of religious studies at the University of Detroit Mercy
Kevin Saliba - prominent entrepreneur.
Kevin Saliba - Maltese author and literary translator
Marianne Frances Saliba (by marriage) – Australian politician and Member of Parliament
Michael Saliba - a congressional candidate in the state of Michigan, in the United States  
Mona Saliba - News Anchor, Talk Show Host and Senior Reporter at Murr Television (MTV Lebanon)
Najib Elias Saliba - Author of "Emigration from Syria and the Syrian-Lebanese community of Worcester, MA"
Naseeb Saliba – co-founder of the Tutor-Saliba Corporation, one of the largest civil construction companies in the United States
Nassar Saliba - Co-founder of the Tutor-Saliba Corporation, one of the largest construction companies in the United States. Responsible for the construction of LAX, SFO, The Olympic Stadium in Los Angeles, among many others major United States landmarks.
Nejm Elias Saliba - Mayor of Bteghrine, Lebanon
Nicky Saliba - former professional football player in Malta
Paul Saliba - Antiochian Orthodox Metropolitan Archbishop and Primate of Australia and New Zealand
:fr:Pietro de Saliba - Italian Renaissance painter
Philip Saliba – Antiochian Orthodox Archbishop of New York and Metropolitan of North America
Robert Saliba Ph.D. - Professor at the American University of Beirut school of Engineering and Architecture 
Sabine Mohasseb Saliba - Renowned French scholar, publishing works covering general, intellectual and Christian histories in the Ottoman and pre-modern Middle Eastern eras
Saliba Sarsar Ph.D. - Originally from Jerusalem, Sarsar is a Middle East affairs and Islamic studies professor at Monmouth University and board member and prominent writer for the American Task Force on Palestine and an integral part of Israeli-Palestinian dialogue
Sam R. Saliba (Wisam Saliba) – Vice President/Marketing Executive for the world's top Tech and Entertainment brands including: Activision Blizzard, Facebook, Google, Ubisoft, Lucasfilm, and Intel. Credited in over 50 video game titles.
Samir Saliba - Retired professor at Emory and Henry College, Samir published works and taught on topics from law to Middle Eastern affairs. In 1970, the university established the Samir N. Saliba Endowment for International Studies.
Therese Saliba - Arab-American scholar, professor, writer, Palestinian activist and feminist best known for her book "Gender, Politics, and Islam" and "Party Politics, Religion, and Women's Leadership: Lebanon in Comparative Perspective" 
Walid Saliba - Prominent Lebanese-American Cardiologist at the Cleveland Clinic, Cleveland
Walid Saliba MD - Doctor and researcher at the Caramel Medical Center in Haifa, Israel
William Saliba - French professional footballer
Wissam Saliba - Lebanese Musician

Salibi, Saleebey and Saleeby
Caleb Saleeby - Lebanese-English physician, writer, and journalist known for his support of eugenics. During World War I, he was an adviser to the Minister of Food and advocated the establishment of a Ministry of Health.
Dennis Saleebey - American academic credited with codifying and promoting the social work practice of Strength Based Practice during his time at the University of Kansas
Jacob Bar-Salibi - Also known as Dionysius Bar-Salibi, he was the best-known and most prolific writer in the Syriac Orthodox Church of the twelfth century.
Kamal Salibi – director of the Royal Institute for Inter-Faith Studies and emeritus professor at the Department of History and Archaeology at the American University of Beirut in Lebanon
Maurice Salibi, Syrian communist politician
Nayla Salibi - French journalist and radio producer

See also
Saliba (disambiguation)
 1st century in Lebanon
Greek Orthodox Church of Antioch
Arab Americans
Lebanese Americans
Bteghrine Lebanon
Nazareth 
Syrian nationalism
Christian emigration
Malta
Melkite
Greek Orthodox Church of Jerusalem
Antiochian Greek Christians
Antiochian Orthodox Christian Archdiocese of North America
Achrafieh neighborhood Beirut Lebanon
Haifa Israel
Cleveland, Ohio
British Mandate of Palestine
American University of Beirut
Greek Orthodox Christianity in Lebanon
Syriac Orthodox Church
Palestinian Christians
Syrian Communist Party

References 

Charles A. Gauci. An Illustrated Collection of the Coats of Arms of Maltese Families Stemmi Maltesi Publishers Enterprises Group (PEG) Ltd, Malta 1989.

External links 
 Saleeby-Saliba Association of Families
 Bteghrine and old sparta ruins

Lebanese families
Palestinian families